Marcher may refer to:

one who is marching
one who takes part in a demonstration (political)
anything pertaining to a march (territory), especially
the Welsh Marches
a Marcher Lord
March law